Hruševlje is a village in the Municipality of Brda in the Littoral region of Slovenia, right on the border with Italy.

The local church is dedicated to Saint Margaret and belongs to the Parish of Šlovrenc.

References

External links
Hruševlje on Geopedia

Populated places in the Municipality of Brda